Michael Kergin (born 26 April 1942) is a Canadian career diplomat, who has been a member of the foreign service in some capacity since 1967, when he joined the Department of External Affairs.

Education and Career 
Kergin graduated from the University of Trinity College in the University of Toronto in 1965, and received a degree from Magdelen College, Oxford University, in 1967. He served as the 19th Canadian ambassador to the United States of America from 26 October 2000 until 28 February 2005. Previously, he had been the Canadian ambassador to Cuba from 1986 to 1989.

Kergin is currently a senior fellow at the University of Ottawa’s Graduate School of Public and International Affairs. Previously, he served as an advisor to Ontario Premier Dalton McGuinty on international affairs.

References

External links

Official Biography

1942 births
Living people
Alumni of Magdalen College, Oxford
Ambassadors of Canada to the United States
Trinity College (Canada) alumni
University of Toronto alumni
Ambassadors of Canada to Cuba